Kelli Christine O'Hara (born April 16, 1976) is an American actress and singer, most known for her work on the Broadway and opera stages.

A seven-time Tony Award nominee, O'Hara won the 2015 Tony Award for Best Actress in a Musical for her performance as Anna Leonowens in the Lincoln Center Theater revival of The King and I. She also received Tony nominations for her performances in The Light in the Piazza (2005), The Pajama Game (2006), South Pacific (2008), Nice Work If You Can Get It (2012), The Bridges of Madison County (2014), and Kiss Me, Kate (2019). O'Hara also received a 2019 Olivier Award nomination for her performance as Anna Leonowens in the West End revival of The King and I.
 
O'Hara made her debut at The Metropolitan Opera in a 2014 production of Franz Lehár's The Merry Widow. In 2018, she played the role of Despina in the Met Opera's production of Mozart's Cosi fan tutte. In 2022, she returned to the Met Opera, starring as Laura Brown in Kevin Puts' The Hours. 

She has also played roles in television series, such as Masters of Sex and 13 Reasons Why, receiving a Primetime Emmy Award nomination for her starring role in the 2017 web drama series The Accidental Wolf.

Early life 
O'Hara was born in Tulsa, Oklahoma, and grew up in Elk City, Oklahoma in an Irish American family. She graduated from Deer Creek High School and also attended Oklahoma City University, graduating with a bachelor's degree in music in vocal performance/opera. O'Hara studied voice with Florence Birdwell, who also taught Kristin Chenoweth four years earlier. O'Hara and Chenoweth are both alumnae of the Gamma Phi Beta sorority.

Career

Early career
One of O'Hara's earliest professional roles was in a US national tour of the musical Jekyll & Hyde. She next played the role of Young Hattie in the 2001 Broadway revival of Follies, and then played the role of Young Phyllis. She next appeared in the 2002 Broadway production of Sweet Smell of Success as Susan. In 2003 she played Albertine in the Off-Broadway Playwrights Horizons production of the musical My Life With Albertine, and, in 2004, Lucy Westenra in the Broadway production of Dracula, the Musical.

She starred as Clara in the 2005 Broadway production of The Light in the Piazza at Lincoln Center's Vivian Beaumont Theatre. She had appeared in a workshop of the musical at the Theatre Lab at Sundance, and in tryouts in Seattle and Chicago, as the character of Franca. She received a 2005 Tony Award nomination for Best Performance by a Featured Actress in a Musical. O'Hara has been nominated for, or won, a Tony Award for every subsequent role she has played on Broadway. In her next Broadway musical, she played Babe in the 2006 revival of The Pajama Game, for which she was nominated for Best Leading Actress in a Musical. For this performance, New York Times reviewer Ben Brantley wrote that O'Hara "rockets past the promising ingénue status she attained with Light in the Piazza".

In 2007, O'Hara played the role of Dot/Marie in the Los Angeles Reprise! concert staging of Sunday in the Park with George and Eliza Doolittle in the New York Philharmonic's semi-staged production of My Fair Lady at Avery Fisher Hall. She was the voice of producer Beth Totenbag on PBS's 2008 animated series Click and Clack's As the Wrench Turns. From 2008 to 2010, O'Hara starred as Nellie Forbush in the Broadway revival of South Pacific at Lincoln Center's Vivian Beaumont Theater, for which she was nominated for her third Tony Award. She took maternity leave in March 2009 and returned to the musical in October 2009.

O'Hara played the role of Ella Peterson in the 2010 New York City Center Encores! concert presentation of Bells Are Ringing. She played the role of Ellen in the film Sex and the City 2 (2010), and in 2011 she appeared in "Mercy", the first episode of the second season of the CBS show Blue Bloods. Also in 2011, she played the role of Amalia in a benefit concert of She Loves Me, presented by the Roundabout Theater Company, in honor of the company's 20th anniversary. Scott Ellis directed, and the musical director was Paul Gemignani. She had performed one of the best known songs from the show, "Will He Like Me?", the previous evening at Kennedy Center in honor of Barbara Cook.

She starred on Broadway as Billie Bendix in Nice Work If You Can Get It from April 2012 to March 2013 and received her fourth Tony Award nomination. In 2012, at the New Year's Eve concert, "Celebrating Marvin Hamlisch", at Lincoln Center, she sang "At the Ballet", from A Chorus Line, along with Audra McDonald and Megan Hilty. In 2013, she played the lead character of Julie in the staged concert of Carousel presented by the New York Philharmonic at Avery Fisher Hall. From January to May 2014, she starred as Francesca Johnson in the Broadway musical The Bridges of Madison County, for which she received her fifth Tony Award nomination. Elyse Sommer, the CurtainUp.com reviewer, noted O'Hara's "superb vocal chops" and her "exquisite" duets with co-star Steven Pasquale. She played Mrs. Darling in the 2014 NBC telecast Peter Pan Live!. She sang two concerts, titled Kelli and Matthew: Home for the Holidays, in December 2014 at Carnegie Hall with the New York Pops. On December 31, 2014, O'Hara made her operatic debut at The Metropolitan Opera as Valencienne in Franz Lehár's The Merry Widow, alongside Renee Fleming in the title role.

2015–present
O'Hara returned to Lincoln Center Theatre to star as Anna Leonowens in the Broadway revival of The King and I opposite Ken Watanabe as The King. The production began previews at the Vivian Beaumont Theatre in March 2015 and opened in April 2015. This role won O'Hara her first Tony Award. O'Hara's final performance as Anna was in April 2016. She gave her debut solo concert at Carnegie Hall in October 2016 and guest-starred as the recurring character Dody on the fourth season of Masters of Sex. She played Fiona in the Encores! production of Brigadoon at New York City Center in November 2017. Jeremy Gerard of Deadline Hollywood called O'Hara's performance "luminous", writing: "O’Hara is impossibly beautiful, vocally and in conveying Fiona’s romantic determination and heartbreak." In 2017, she starred as Kate Bonner in the first season of the web drama series The Accidental Wolf, earning a 2018 Primetime Emmy Award nomination.

O'Hara appeared in the 2018 season of 13 Reasons Why as Jackie, an anti-bullying advocate. The same year at the Metropolitan Opera, she sang the role of Despina in Così fan tutte. She reprised her role in The King and I at the London Palladium for a limited run from June to September 2018.

She returned to Broadway in February 2019 in a revival of Kiss Me, Kate at Studio 54, as Lilli Vanessi/Katharine. The production was directed by Scott Ellis and choreographed by Warren Carlyle. The revival was produced by the Roundabout Theatre Company, which had produced a benefit concert of the show with O'Hara, Ellis, and Carlyle in 2016. O'Hara received her seventh Tony Award nomination for the revival.

In a 2022 interview with Theatermania, she discussed working on three projects at once: HBO's costume drama The Gilded Age, from Downton Abbey creator Julian Fellowes; a new season of The Accidental Wolf, in a role that earned her a 2018 Emmy nomination, as a woman who becomes embroiled in a scandal after receiving a phone call from a stranger being murdered; and a role in the operatic adaptation of Michael Cunningham's novel The Hours. She said "I love the fact that you have these things at the same time, because I don't ever want to be put in one box. I couldn't be happier or more challenged to have these three things happening at once."

Personal life
O'Hara is married to Greg Naughton of The Sweet Remains, son of actor James Naughton. Their first child, Owen James, was born in 2009. Their daughter, Charlotte, was born in 2013.

Filmography

Film

Television

Web

Stage roles 

Broadway
 Jekyll & Hyde (2000) as Kate (replacement) / Emma (understudy)
 Follies (2001) as Young Hattie/Ensemble, then as Young Hattie
 Sweet Smell of Success: The Musical (2002) as Susan
 Dracula, the Musical (2004) as Lucy Westenra
 The Light in the Piazza (2005) as Clara Johnson
 The Pajama Game (2006) as Babe Williams
 South Pacific (2008) as Nellie Forbush
 Nice Work If You Can Get It (2012) as Billie Bendix
 The Bridges of Madison County (2014) as Francesca Johnson
 The King and I (2015) as Anna Leonowens
 Kiss Me, Kate (2019) as Lilli Vanessi/Katharine

 West End
 The King and I (2018) as Anna Leonowens

Off-Broadway and regional theatre
 Beauty by Tina Landau (2003) (La Jolla Playhouse)
 My Life with Albertine (2003) as Albertine (Off-Broadway)
 The Light in the Piazza (2004) as Franca (in Seattle and Chicago)
 Far From Heaven (2012) as Cathy Whitaker (developmental premiere, Williamstown Theatre Festival)
 The King and I (2019) as Anna Leonowens (Tokyu Orb Theatre)

Operatic repertoire
 The Merry Widow by Franz Lehár (2014) as Valencienne (Metropolitan Opera)
 Dido and Aeneas by Henry Purcell (2016) as Dido (MasterVoices and the Orchestra of St. Luke's)
 Così fan tutte by Wolfgang Amadeus Mozart (2018) as Despina (Metropolitan Opera)
 The Hours by Kevin Puts (2022) as Laura Brown (Metropolitan Opera)

Discography 
2008 Wonder in the World
2011 Always

Cast recordings
 2002 Sweet Smell of Success
 2003 My Life with Albertine
 2005 The Light in the Piazza
 2006 Harry on Broadway, Act I—two-disc set: 1. Original Broadway cast recording The Pajama Game; 2. Songs from Thou Shalt Not, Harry Connick, Jr. featuring Kelli O'Hara
 2008 South Pacific
 2012 Nice Work If You Can Get It
 2014 The Bridges of Madison County
 2015 The King and I
 2019 Kiss Me, Kate
 2020 Christmas Day in the Morning

Soundtracks
 2014 Peter Pan Live!

Awards and nominations

References

External links 

 
 
 
 
 
 Kelli O'Hara from The Pajama Game: Downstage Center interview at American Theatre Wing.org
 Kelli O'Hara Interview by Beth Stevens on Broadway.com

1976 births
Living people
21st-century American actresses
21st-century American singers
21st-century American women singers
Actresses from Oklahoma
American musical theatre actresses
American people of Irish descent
American sopranos
Lee Strasberg Theatre and Film Institute alumni
Musicians from Tulsa, Oklahoma
Oklahoma City University alumni
Singers from Oklahoma
Tony Award winners